Shoripuri - is situated at a distance of 75 km from Agra, 25 km from Shikohabad and 1.5 km on hilly road from Bateshvara on the banks of Yamuna river in Uttar Pradesh.

In Jainism
It was a city where Jain Tirthankara Neminatha was born. There are several Jain temples in this area.

References

Citations

Sources

External links 
 

Archaeological sites in Uttar Pradesh